Peter Freeman may refer to:
 Peter A. Freeman (born 1941), founding dean of the Georgia Tech College of Computing
 Peter Freeman (musician) (1965–2021), American multi-instrumentalist, composer and music producer
 Peter Freeman (footballer) (born 1969), former Australian rules footballer
 Peter Freeman (politician) (1888–1956), Labour Party politician in the United Kingdom
 Peter Anthony Freeman, Welsh author and storyteller

See also
 Peter Friedman (born 1949), American actor